James Garvey may refer to:

 James Garvey (footballer) (1880–?), English footballer
 James Garvey (philosopher), American philosopher
 James Garvey (politician) (born 1964), politician in Louisiana
 James Garvey (hurler) (1899–1987), Irish hurler